The following is a list of specific strikes (workers refusing to work, seeking to change their conditions in a particular industry or an individual workplace, or striking in solidarity with those in another particular workplace) and general strikes (widespread refusal of workers to work in an organized political campaign on a broader national or international level).

Chronological list of strikes

Twelfth century BCE

Sixteenth century

Seventeenth century

Eighteenth century

Nineteenth century

1800–1849

1850–1899

Twentieth century

1900s

1910s

1920s

1930s

1940s

1950s

1960s

1970s

1980s

1990s

Twenty-first century

2000s

2010s

2020s

Chronological list of general strikes

See also

List of miners' strikes
List of worker deaths in United States labor disputes
Streetcar strikes in the United States
Strikes during the COVID-19 pandemic
Timeline of labor unions in the United States

References

Further reading
Labor conflict in the United States, An encyclopedia. edited by Ronald Filippelli, assisted by Carol Reilly – Garland Publishing New York & London 1990 

External links
 Chronology of general strikes
 List of labor events in U.S. history
 Recent strikes and other labour news
 Strike! Famous Worker Uprisings – slideshow by Life magazine
 The Long War at Staley

Society-related lists